Dinghao Market is one of five major electronics markets in Zhongguancun, Beijing.

History
Li Zhongjin is the current chief business officer of Dinghao Market.

Dinghao Market is home to Lenovo's flagship store and Starbucks 1000th milestone Asian location.

See also
Guigu Market
Hailong Market
Kemao Market
Taipingyang Market

References

External links
Official site

Economy of Beijing
Tourist attractions in Beijing
Zhongguancun